The Swing Of Things was released as an audiobook that included unreleased songs/demos created by the Norwegian band a-ha from their early years.

Track listing

 Take on Me - This demo was recorded at Rendezvous studio in Sydenham in April 1983. It is the first version featuring the complete song as we know it.
 Presenting Lily Mars - Inspired by the 1943 film of the same name, this version was recorded at Naersnes in autumn 1982. a-ha re-recorded this at Rendezvous studio in 1984 as a possible B-side or album track but this version, sadly, remains unissued. The Rendezvous demo can only be found on the 2015 limited super-deluxe edition of Hunting High and Low. When the song ends, we can hear one of the band members playing an unidentified song and singing a melody (No actual words are sung.).
 Dot The I - This version was recorded at Naersnes in autumn 1982, it was later edited for the CD release, as the original master tape features Morten Harket yodeling. It was re-recorded at Rendezvous in April 1983 and was, in fact, the first track that a-ha recorded there. When the song ends, we can hear the band working on a very early version of Early Morning.
 Days On End - Rendezvous demo from October 1983, featuring Guitarist Paul on piano and Morten on trombone (keyboardist Mags was absent). The original title, as written on the tape box from the studio, was "If You Do".
 The Love Goodbye - Another Rendezvous demo from the spring of 1983.
 Monday Mourning - Rendezvous demo from late 1983.
 Never Never - Rendezvous demo from late 1983.
 Nå Blåser Det På Jorden - Translated as "Now It Blows On The Earth", this is the first song they ever committed to tape in September 1982. It is not, however, contrary to some sources, the only song a-ha recorded in Norwegian.
 Go to Sleep - Rendezvous demo, late 1983. The opening lines were re-used in "And You Tell Me".
 Hunting High and Low - Rendezvous demo, 1984. The line "There's something dark against the light" was re-used in "Dream Myself Alive".
 I've Been Losing You - Rendezvous demo, 1984. When the song ends, we can hear the band working on the drums for an unidentified song.
 The Swing of Things - The last of the three demos. It has the same lyrics as the final version. It is unclear where this one was recorded.
 Living a Boy's Adventure Tale - Although this is a bonus track on the demo CD, it's actually an early version of the album version, containing different drums and vocals.

References

A-ha albums
2004 albums